Benedict of Cagliari was a Benedictine Bishop of Dolia, Sardinia. He was a monk at the abbey of St. Saturninus in that city when he was made bishop in 1107. Serving for five years, Benedict then retired to the basilica abbey.

Notes

Italian Roman Catholic saints
12th-century Christian saints
1112 deaths
Italian Benedictines
12th-century Italian Roman Catholic bishops
Year of birth unknown